Our Lady's Abingdon is a Catholic, co-educational, private day school in Abingdon-on-Thames, Oxfordshire, England, for pupils aged 7–18.

History
Our Lady's Convent was founded in 1860 by Sister Clare Moore of the Sisters of Mercy, who worked closely with Florence Nightingale. The school's main auditorium is named after her, the Clare Moore Auditorium, known as the CMA. The school began educating boys and girls from the local area, with a boarding school created in 1866.

The school was reconstituted independently of the Sisters of Mercy in 2004 as a registered charity in England & Wales, formally titled Our Lady's Abingdon Trustees Ltd. The Sisters have since left Abingdon in 2011 but they maintain a representative on the Board of Governors.

In 2009 the school began admitting boys into the senior school. The school name was changed to Our Lady's Abingdon to reflect the change. Since the 2013–14 academic year, it has been fully co-educational. As of 2016, there appeared to be a 50/50 split of boys and girls.

Daniel Gibbons, formerly Deputy Head of Downside School, took over as Head from September 2021.

Academics
A-level results 2020
Overall pass	99%
Grade A* – B	75%

GCSE results 2020
Overall pass	97%
Grade A* to B	67%
Grade A* to C	81%

Extracurricular
Extra-curricular music includes choir, orchestra and wind-band. Other activities include Drama, the Duke of Edinburgh's Award, Languages, Poetry, Reading, Science and Textiles.

Students in Year 11 and sixth Form take part in a team challenge expedition and community work overseas.

The PE department run sports clubs Monday to Friday both at lunchtime and after school. Activities include swimming, netball, hockey, cross-country running, trampolining, fitness, football, badminton, rounders, athletics, tennis, basketball, synchronised swimming, dance and gymnastics.

Pupils are encouraged to participate in extra-curricular sports clubs regardless of their ability, and they offer a range of after-school fixtures which gives the pupils the opportunity to compete against other schools and take part in county and national competitions.

Pastoral Care
As a Catholic school, mass and feast days are regularly celebrated and open to parents and visitors. The school is located within the Parish of Our Lady and St Edmund and is regularly visited by the parish priest, who is also a member of the Board of Governors.

See also
List of schools in the South East of England
List of independent schools in the United Kingdom

References

External links
 Our Lady's Abingdon website

 Profile on the independent schools Council website

Abingdon-on-Thames
Private schools in Oxfordshire
1860 establishments in England
Educational charities based in the United Kingdom
Sisters of Mercy schools
Roman Catholic private schools in the Diocese of Portsmouth
Educational institutions established in 1860